Wadelincourt is the name of a number of places.
Wadelincourt, Ardennes in France.
Wadelincourt, Wallonia, in Belgium.